The Mid-Atlantic accent, or Transatlantic accent, is a consciously learned accent of English, fashionably used by the late 19th-century and early 20th-century American upper class and entertainment industry, which blended together features regarded as the most prestigious from both American and British English (specifically Received Pronunciation). It is not a native or regional accent; rather, according to voice and drama professor Dudley Knight, "its earliest advocates bragged that its chief quality was that no Americans actually spoke it unless educated to do so". The accent was embraced in private independent preparatory schools, especially by members of the American Northeastern upper class, as well as in schools for film and stage acting, with its overall use sharply declining after the Second World War. A similar accent that resulted from different historical processes, Canadian dainty, was also known in Canada, existing for a century before waning in the 1950s. More recently, the term "mid-Atlantic accent" can also refer to any accent with a perceived mixture of American and British characteristics.

Elite use

History
In the 19th century and into the early 20th century, formal public speaking in the United States focused primarily on song-like intonation, lengthily and tremulously uttered vowels (including overly articulated weak vowels), and a booming resonance. Moreover, since at least the mid-19th century, upper-class communities on the East Coast of the United States increasingly adopted many of the phonetic qualities of Received Pronunciation—the standard accent of the British upper class—as evidenced in recorded public speeches of the time, with some of these qualities, like non-rhoticity (sometimes called "r-lessness"), also shared by the regional dialects of Eastern New England and New York City. Sociolinguist William Labov et al. describe that such "r-less pronunciation, following Received Pronunciation, was taught as a model of correct, international English by schools of speech, acting, and elocution in the United States up to the end of World War II".

Early recordings of prominent Americans born in the middle of the 19th century provide some insight into their adoption or not of a carefully employed non-rhotic Mid-Atlantic speaking style. President William Howard Taft, who attended public school in Ohio, and inventor Thomas Edison, who grew up in Ohio and Michigan of modest means, both used natural rhotic accents. Yet presidents William McKinley of Ohio and Grover Cleveland of Central New York, who attended private schools, clearly employed a non-rhotic, upper-class, Mid-Atlantic quality in their public speeches that does not align to the rhotic accents normally documented in Ohio and Central New York at the time; both men even use the distinctive and especially archaic affectation of a "tapped r" at times when r is pronounced, often when between vowels. This tapped articulation is additionally sometimes heard in recordings of Theodore Roosevelt, McKinley's successor from an affluent district of New York City, who used a cultivated non-rhotic accent but with the addition of the coil-curl merger once notably associated with New York accents. His distant cousin Franklin D. Roosevelt also employed a non-rhotic Mid-Atlantic accent, though without the tapped r.

In and around Boston, Massachusetts, a similar accent, in the late 19th century and early 20th century, was associated with the local urban elite: the Boston Brahmins. In the New York metropolitan area, particularly including its affluent Westchester County suburbs and the North Shore of Long Island, other terms for the local Transatlantic pronunciation and accompanying facial behavior include "Locust Valley lockjaw" or "Larchmont lockjaw", named for the stereotypical clenching of the speaker's jaw muscles to achieve an exaggerated enunciation quality. The related term "boarding-school lockjaw" has also been used to describe the accent once considered a characteristic of elite New England boarding school culture.

Vocal coach and scholar Dudley Knight describes how the Australian phonetician William Tilly (né Tilley), teaching at Columbia University from 1918 to around the time of his death in 1935, introduced a version of the Mid-Atlantic accent that, for the first time, was standardized with an extreme and conscious level of phonetic consistency. Linguistic prescriptivists, Tilly and his adherents emphatically promoted their new Mid-Atlantic speech standard, which they called "World English". World English would eventually define the pronunciation of American classical actors for decades, though Tilly himself actually had no special interest in acting. Mostly attracting a following of English-language learners and New York City public-school teachers, he was interested in popularizing his standard of a "proper" American pronunciation for teaching in public schools and using in one's public life: 

World English as a phonetically consistent version of Mid-Atlantic pronunciation was advocated most strongly from the 1920s to the mid-1940s and was particularly embraced in this period within Northeastern independent preparatory schools mostly accessible to and supported by aristocratic American families. However, following and presumably as a result of the Second World War and its accompanying cultural and demographic changes in the United States, the prestige of Mid-Atlantic accents largely ended by 1950.

Example speakers
Wealthy or highly educated Americans known for being lifelong speakers of a Mid-Atlantic accent include William F. Buckley Jr., Gore Vidal, H. P. Lovecraft, Franklin D. and Eleanor Roosevelt, Alice Roosevelt Longworth, Averell Harriman, Dean Acheson, George Plimpton, Jacqueline Kennedy Onassis (who began affecting it permanently while at Miss Porter's School), Louis Auchincloss, Norman Mailer, Diana Vreeland (though her accent is unique, with not entirely consistent Mid-Atlantic features), C. Z. Guest Joseph Alsop, Robert Silvers, Julia Child (though, as the lone non-Northeasterner in this list, her accent was consistently rhotic), and Cornelius Vanderbilt IV. Except for Child, all of these example speakers were raised, educated, or both in the Northeastern United States. This includes just over half who were raised specifically in New York (most of them New York City) and five of whom were educated specifically at the independent boarding school Groton in Massachusetts: Franklin Roosevelt, Harriman, Acheson, Alsop, and Auchincloss.

Examples of individuals described as having a cultivated New England accent or "Boston Brahmin accent" include Henry Cabot Lodge Jr., Charles Eliot Norton, Samuel Eliot Morison, Harry Crosby, John Brooks Wheelwright, George C. Homans, Elliot Richardson, George Plimpton (though he was actually a lifelong member of the New York City elite), and John Kerry, who has noticeably reduced this accent since his early adulthood toward a more General American one. 

U.S. President Franklin D. Roosevelt, who came from a privileged New York City family, has a non-rhotic accent, though it is not an ordinary New York accent; one of Roosevelt's most frequently heard speeches has a falling diphthong in the word fear, which distinguishes it from other forms of surviving non-rhotic speech in the United States. "Linking r" appears in Roosevelt's delivery of the words "The only thing we have to fear is fear itself"; this pronunciation of r is also famously recorded in his Pearl Harbor speech, for example, in the phrase "naval and air forces of the Empire of Japan".

Decline
After the accent's decline following the end of World War II, this American version of a "posh" accent has all but disappeared even among the American upper classes, as Americans have increasingly dissociated from the effete speaking styles of the East Coast elite; if anything, the accent is now subject to ridicule in American popular culture. The clipped, non-rhotic English accents of George Plimpton and William F. Buckley Jr. were vestigial examples. Self-help author and 2020 Democratic presidential candidate Marianne Williamson has a unique accent that, following her participation in the first 2020 presidential debate in June 2019, was widely discussed and sometimes described as a Mid-Atlantic accent. An article from The Guardian, for example, stated that Williamson "speaks in a beguiling mid-Atlantic accent that makes her sound as if she has walked straight off the set of a Cary Grant movie."

Theatrical and cinematic use 
When the 20th century began, classical training for actors in the United States explicitly focused on imitating upper-class British accents onstage. From the 1920s to 1940s, the "World English" of William Tilly, and his followers' slight variations of it taught in classes of theatre and oratory, became popular affectations onstage and in other forms of high culture in North America. The codification of a Mid-Atlantic accent in writing, particularly for theatrical training, is often credited to Edith Warman Skinner in the 1930s, a student of Tilly best known for her 1942 instructional text on the accent: Speak with Distinction. Skinner, who referred to this accent as Good (American) Speech or Eastern (American) Standard, described it as the appropriate American pronunciation for "classics and elevated texts". She vigorously drilled her students in learning the accent at the Carnegie Institute of Technology and, later, the Juilliard School.

It is also possible that a clipped, nasal, "all-treble" acoustic quality sometimes associated with the Mid-Atlantic accent arose out of technological necessity in the earliest days of radio and sound film, which ineffectively reproduced natural human bass tones. As used by actors, the Mid-Atlantic accent is also known by various other names, including American Theatre Standard or American stage speech.

American cinema began in the early 1900s in New York City and Philadelphia before becoming largely transplanted to Los Angeles beginning in the mid-1910s, with talkies beginning in the late 1920s. Hollywood studios encouraged actors to learn this accent into the 1940s.

Examples of actors known for publicly using this accent include Tyrone Power, Bette Davis, Katharine Hepburn, Laird Cregar, Vincent Price (who also went to school in Connecticut), Christopher Plummer, Sally Kellerman, Tammy Grimes, and Westbrook Van Voorhis. Cary Grant, who arrived in the United States from England at age of sixteen, had an accent that was often considered Mid-Atlantic, though with a more natural and unconscious mixture of both British and American features. Roscoe Lee Browne, defying roles typically cast for black actors, also consistently spoke with a Mid-Atlantic accent. Humorist Tom Lehrer lampooned this accent in a 1945 satirical tribute to his alma mater, Harvard University, called "Fight Fiercely, Harvard". Actor and singer David Cassidy noted that his father, Jack Cassidy, used the Mid-Atlantic accent.

Examples 
Although it has disappeared as a standard of high society and high culture, the Transatlantic accent has still been heard in some media in the second half of the 20th century, or even more recently, for the sake of historical, humorous, or other stylistic reasons:

 In the film Auntie Mame (1958), Gloria Upson's accent identifies her as a “lockjawed prep princess” from Connecticut's WASP elite. 
 Elizabeth Banks uses the Mid-Atlantic accent in playing the flamboyant, fussy, upper-class character Effie Trinket in the Hunger Games film series, which depicts enormous class divisions in a futuristic North America.
 An example of this accent appears in the television sitcom Frasier used by the snobbish Crane brothers, who are played by Kelsey Grammer and David Hyde Pierce.
 David Ogden Stiers used the accent in portraying wealthy Bostonian Major Charles Emerson Winchester III on the TV series M*A*S*H.
 Jim Backus and Natalie Schafer portrayed Thurston and Lovey Howell, a millionaire couple on the 1960s TV series Gilligan's Island; they both employed the Locust Valley lockjaw accent.
 In the Star Wars film franchise, the character Darth Vader (voiced by James Earl Jones) noticeably speaks with a deep bass tone and a Mid-Atlantic accent to suggest his position of high authority; Princess Leia (played by Carrie Fisher) and Queen Amidala (played by Natalie Portman) also use this accent when switching to a formal speaking register in political situations.
 Many 20th-century Disney villains speak either with a British accent (e.g., Shere Khan, Prince John, the Horned King, Scar, and Frollo) or a Transatlantic accent (notably, the Evil Queen from Snow White, Maleficent, Cruella de Vil, Lady Tremaine, Mother Gothel, Vincent Price's Professor Ratigan, Jafar, and Eartha Kitt's Yzma).
 Mr. Burns, Sideshow Bob, and Cecil Terwilliger from The Simpsons all speak with a Mid-Atlantic accent, with the latter two characters voiced by the aforementioned Kelsey Grammer and David Hyde Pierce, respectively.
In the animated television series The Critic, Franklin Sherman (an affluent former governor of New York) and his wife Eleanor Sherman both speak with pronounced Locust Valley Lockjaw accents.
Mark Hamill's vocal portrayal of Batman villain the Joker adopts a highly theatrical Mid-Atlantic accent throughout the character's many animation and video game appearances.
 Evan Peters employs a Mid-Atlantic accent as James Patrick March, a ghostly serial killer from the 1920s on American Horror Story: Hotel, as does Mare Winningham as March's accomplice, Miss Evers.
 Alexander Scourby was an American stage, film, and voice actor who continues to be well-known for his recording of the entire King James Bible completed in 1953. Scourby was often employed as a voice actor and narrator in advertisements and in media put out by the National Geographic Society. His well-refined mid-Atlantic accent was considered desirable for such roles.

Phonology 
The Mid-Atlantic accent was carefully taught as a model of "correct" English in American elocution classes, and it was also taught for use in the American theatre prior to the 1960s, after which it fell out of vogue. It is still taught to actors for use in playing historical characters.

A codified version of the Mid-Atlantic accent, American Theatre Standard, advocated by voice coaches like Edith Skinner ("Good Speech" as she called it) and Margaret Prendergast McLean, was once widely taught in acting schools of the early-mid-20th century.

Vowels 

]

 Trap–bath split: The Mid-Atlantic accent exhibits the  split of RP.
 No /æ/ tensing: While most dialects of American English have the  vowel tensed before nasals, the vowel is not particularly tensed in this environment in Mid-Atlantic accents.
 Father–bother variability: The "a" in father is unrounded, while the "bother" vowel may be rounded, like RP. Therefore, the father-bother distinction exists for some speakers, particularly those following the 20th-century American Theatre Standard in the vein of Skinner, but not necessarily in aristocratic speakers trained before that time or outside of the entertainment industry, like Franklin Roosevelt, who indeed shows a merger. The bother vowel is also used in words like "watch" and "quad".
No cot–caught merger: The vowels in cot and caught (the  vowel and  vowel, respectively) are distinguished, with the latter being pronounced higher and longer than the former, like RP.
Lot–cloth variability: Like contemporary RP, but unlike conservative RP and General American, Theatre Standard promoted that the words in the  lexical set use the  vowel rather than the  vowel. However, speakers trained before the Theatre Standard, like Franklin Roosevelt, indeed show a - split, with the latter aligning to the  vowel. The  vowel is also used before  in words such as "all", "salt", and "malt".
Lack of happy tensing: Like conservative RP, the vowel  at the end of words such as "happy" , "Charlie", "sherry", "coffee" is not tensed and is thus pronounced with the SIT vowel , rather than the SEAT vowel . This also extends to "i", "y", and sometimes "e", "ie", and "ee" in other positions in words. For example, the SIT vowel is used in "cities", "remark", "because", "serious", "variable".
This is done in General American, as well, but in the Mid-Atlantic accent, the same distinction means the retention of historic  in weak preconsonantal positions (as in RP), so "rabbit" does not rhyme with "abbot".
 Lack of mergers before : Mergers before , which are typical of several accents, both British and North American, do not occur.

Vowels before  
In a Mid-Atlantic accent, the postvocalic  is typically either dropped or vocalized. The vowels  or  do not undergo R-coloring. Linking R is used, but Skinner openly disapproved of intrusive R. In Mid-Atlantic accents, intervocalic 's and linking r's undergo liaison.

The following distinctions are examples of this concept:
 "Marry" is pronounced with a different vowel altogether. See further in the bullet list below.

Other distinctions before  include the following:
Hence saw , sauce  but sore/sour , source .
Hence spa , alms  but spar , arms . This keeps the distinction observed in rhotic accents like General American, but not made in RP.

Consonants 
A table containing the consonant phonemes is given below:

 Wine-whine distinction: The Mid-Atlantic accent resists the modern wine–whine merger: The consonants spelled w and wh are pronounced differently; words spelled with wh are pronounced as "hw". The distinction is a feature found in conservative RP and New England English, as well as in some Canadian and Southern US accents, and sporadically across the Mid-West and the West. However, it is rarely heard in contemporary RP.
 Pronunciation of : the alveolar stop  can be pronounced as a glottal stop, only if it is followed by a consonant in either the same word or the following word. Thus grateful can be pronounced . However, Skinner recommended avoiding the glottal stop altogether; she also recommended a "lightly aspirated"  in place of the flapped /t/ typical of American speakers whenever  appears between vowels. Likewise, winter  is not pronounced similarly or identically to winner , as it is by some Americans. Generally, Skinner advocated for articulating  with some degree of aspiration in most contexts.
All of this mirrors (conservative) RP.
However, Skinner explicitly discouraged darker articulations.
 A tapped articulation of post-consonantal or inter-vocalic  is heard in many of the earliest recordings of Mid-Atlantic accents, likely for dramatic effect in public speaking. Skinner, however, disapproved of its usage.

Other pronunciation patterns
 Skinner approved of the -day suffix (e.g.
 Instead of the unrounded  vowel, the rounded  vowel vowel is used in everybody, nobody, somebody, and anybody; and when stressed, was, of, from, what. This is more like RP than General American. At times, the vowels in the latter words can be reduced to a schwa. However, "because" uses the  vowel.
Thus inventory is pronounced , rather than General American  or rapidly-spoken RP .

See also 
 American English
 Atlas of North American English
 Elocution
 General American English
 Linguistic prescription
 Received Pronunciation

Explanatory notes

Citations

General bibliography

Further reading 
 Robert MacNeil and William Cran, Do You Speak American? (Talese, 2004). .

External links 
 Early radio episodes of The Guiding Light featuring Mid-Atlantic English
 "Puhfect Together", an episode of The Brian Lehrer Show in which William Labov is interviewed about the accent
 "A Dying Race", a segment of the 1986 documentary film American Tongues, in which two Boston Brahmin academics talk about their accents while sitting in the Boston Athenæum

Dialect levelling
Standard English
Upper class culture in the United States
Culture of the Southern United States